Prize Lady is a top New Zealand thoroughbred racehorse.

Background
Prize Lady is a bay mare bred in New Zealand by D.G. & R.B. McLaren Ltd. She was sired by the American stallion Prized who won the Breeders' Cup Turf in 1989.

Racing career
As a three-year-old Prize Lady showed very promising form as she finished second in both the Travis Stakes to Calvert and the New Zealand Oaks behind Justa Tad.

She ventured to Australia in 2005 and was placed fourth in the Queensland Oaks and eighth in the Queensland Derby.

When moved up in distance she showed improved form and won the Auckland Cup in 2007. She repeated her Auckland Cup victory in 2008 becoming the first horse to achieve this feat since Il Tempo in 1970. 

Prize Lady was 17th in the 2008 Melbourne Cup won by Viewed.

She attempted to win her third Auckland Cup in 2009, but finished 8th in what proved to be her last ever race.

Pedigree

Progeny

Prize Lady's son Dragon Storm (born 2/11/2014), sired by 2009 Melbourne Cup winner Shocking, won the 2020 New Zealand Cup.

See also

 Thoroughbred racing in New Zealand

2001 racehorse births
Racehorses bred in New Zealand
Racehorses trained in New Zealand
Auckland Cup winners
Thoroughbred family 6-f